Jeneč is a municipality and village in Prague-West District in the Central Bohemian Region of the Czech Republic. It has about 1,300 inhabitants.

Notable people
Jiří Tichý (1933–2016), footballer

References

Villages in Prague-West District